Sell Your Dope is the third studio album by Afroman, first published by T-Bones Records on September 12, 2000. It contains the hit single "Crazy Rap", also known as "Colt 45 and 2 Zig-Zags". The album was re-released on streaming services on August 17, 2020, under the name Sell Your Dope (OG Re-Release).

Track listing

Original version
"Basehead Boogie"
"Palmdale"
"Crazy Rap"
"Let's All Get Drunk"
"If It Ain't Free"
"Sell Your Dope"
"There's a Price 2 Pay"
"Paranoid"
"Strugglin' n' Strivin'"
"Let Me Out"
"Bacc 2 School"
"Hungry Hustler"
"God Has Smiled on Me"

Notes
 "Let's All Get Drunk" is not included on the re-release
 "Bacc 2 School" is longer on the re-release. Its original length is 5:46.

Re-release
Credits adapted from Tidal, and reflect the 2020 re-release.

References

2000 albums
Afroman albums
T-Bones Records albums